The province of Savona (Ligurian: provinsa de Sann-a) is a province in the Liguria region of Italy. Its capital is the city of Savona, which has a population of 61,219 inhabitants. The province has a total population of 279,754.

History
Savona was first settled by the Ligurian tribe of the Sabazi, who supported the Carthaginians in the Punic Wars. This support of the Carthaginian Empire led to Savona being conquered by the Roman Empire. During the Middle Ages, Savona allied with Frederick II, Holy Roman Emperor and fought against Genoa. In 1440 it also fought against Genoa during its war against the Visconti of Milan; in response, Genoa sacked the city and destroyed the port and shipping. It allied itself with the French in the 16th century, but this campaign also failed and resulted in Genoa invading the area again, this time destroying three loaded ships and the port.

It was occupied by Napoleon's French forces at the start of the 19th century, but the area was later conquered from Napoleon by the Kingdom of Sardinia. Following this, ironworks were founded in Savona and the port revived.

Geography
The province of Savona is one of four provinces in the region of Liguria which forms a coastal strip in the northwest of Italy. Savona has a long coastline on the Gulf of Genoa; the Province of Imperia lies to the west and the Metropolitan City of Genoa lies to the east. The region of Piedmont lies inland, with the Province of Cuneo to the northwest and the provinces of Asti and Alessandria to the north. The provincial capital is the city of Savona. Inland is the mountain chain formed by the Ligurian Alps and the Apennines.

Government

List of presidents of the province of Savona

References

External links
Official website 

 
Savona